"Baby I Don't Care" is a song by English pop rock band Transvision Vamp and the first single taken from their second album, Velveteen. It was released in 1989 and remains their highest-charting single, peaking at number three in both the United Kingdom and Australia. It was ranked at number 25 on the Australian end-of-year chart for 1989. The song was later featured as the title track on the band's 2002 compilation album, Baby I Don't Care.

The sleeve design features the band against a panelled backdrop printed with a large photo of Elvis Presley.

Critical reception
Jerry Smith, reviewer of British music newspaper Music Week, named this track as "another excellent slice of cartoon pop". He found song "very catchy" and expressed opinion that it "will put them back on top". James Brown of New Musical Express noted consistency of quality of a string of band's hits. Music & Media called song a "pure pop in the post-Blondie/ Bangles sense" and praised catchy chorus.

Track listings
All songs were written by Nick Christian Sayer except where noted.

7-inch and cassette single, Japanese mini-CD single 
 "Baby I Don't Care" – 3:57
 "Time for a Change" (Anthony Doughty) – 3:34
 "Strings of My Heart" (Dave Parsons) – 3:12

12-inch single 
A1. "Baby I Don't Care" (Abigail's party mix) – 5:45
B1. "Sex Kick" (demo version) – 5:53
B2. "Time for Change" – 3:34
B3. "Strings of My Heart" – 3:12

CD and German mini-CD single 
 "Baby I Don't Care" – 3:59
 "Saturn 5" (demo version) – 3:48
 "Time for Change" – 3:31
 "Strings of My Heart" – 3:14

US cassette single 
A. "Baby I Don't Care"
B. "Time for a Change"

Charts

Weekly charts

Year-end charts

Certifications

Jennifer Ellison version

In June 2003, British actress Jennifer Ellison covered the song, reaching number six on the UK Singles Chart and number 14 on the Irish Singles Chart with it.

UK CD1 
 "Baby I Don't Care" (radio edit) – 3:39
 "Silent Footsteps" – 4:06
 "Baby I Don't Care" (video) – 3:41

UK CD2 
 "Baby I Don't Care" (radio edit) – 3:39
 "Baby I Don't Care" (Graham Stack / Groove Brothers Remix) – 3:29
 "Baby I Don't Care" (video—karaoke version) – 3:41

UK cassette single 
 "Baby I Don't Care" (radio edit) – 3:39
 "Silent Footsteps" – 4:06
 "Baby I Don't Care" (Graham Stack / Groove Brothers Remix) – 3:29

Charts

Weekly charts

Year-end charts

References

External links
 http://www.itm-ed.de/tvamp/music/discography/babyidontcare.html Worldwide releases

1989 singles
1989 songs
2003 singles
East West Records singles
Jennifer Ellison songs
MCA Records singles
Transvision Vamp songs